Neptis liberti, or Libert's sailer, is a butterfly in the family Nymphalidae. It is found in Nigeria, Cameroon, Gabon and the Democratic Republic of the Congo. The habitat consists of forests.

The larvae feed on Tetrapleura thoningii.

References

Butterflies described in 1998
liberti